Golden Child is a 2019 novel by Claire Adam.

Set in rural Trinidad, it won the Desmond Elliott Prize and was selected on a 2019 BBC list of 100 'most inspiring' novels.

Plot
The story isn't told in a linear fashion. It begins with father Clyde Deyalsingh, coming home to his wife in their home in Trinidad and Tobago. He calls for his son Paul to help him remove the guard dog from the gate so he can park his car. His twin brother Peter arrives informing him that Paul left to go to the river and he doesn't know where he is. Peter is incredibly studious and Paul is quieter and a source of frustration for Clyde. Paul earned the nickname “Tarzan” for having shabby overgrown hair. Clyde goes to look for him to no avail and by midnight is seriously worried. Clyde recounts a break-in the happened two weeks where Paul provoked the robbers and placed Joy's life in danger. The incident caused a fight between the two where Paul remained silent, angering Clyde who bans him from going to a fete he was looking forward to. Clyde insists Paul has a confusing pattern of behaviour, remembering an incident when he saw him lying in the ground at midnight looking at the stars. Clyde has a flashback to the birth of his twin sons, where his uncle (a doctor) tells him his son Paul was oxygen deprived after his umbilical cord was tied around his neck. He was told Paul might suffer from an intelligence disorder but his uncle-in-law Vishnu says he since no obvious abnormality. Uncle Vishnu takes kindly to Clyde and pays for many of the child expenses and finds him a new job with more consistent pay. Clyde doesn't like the rest of Joy's family including Romesh (who always asks for money), Phillip (Joy's rich lawyer brother) and Marilyn (Phillip's pompous rich wife). Another flashback to a younger Paul, who when taken to a hair cutting ceremony was overwhelmed and screamed, causing a scene, embarrassing Clyde. Later on, Clyde is advised to aim to get Peter to Harvard, MIT and other very well established schools. He is also advised by another teacher to take Paul to a mental hospital (St Ann's).

Now the story is told from Paul's perspective. Paul, Peter and their parent visit his principle who makes a joke about Paul being ‘slow’. Paul overheard his parent arguing whether or not to move Peter up a grade, separating him for Peter. Paul doesn't mind but is chastised by Peter who is convinced they'll send him to St Ann's.
Paul recalls the incident when he went out stargazing. Uncle Vishnu and Mousey (Joy's friend who helped raise them) die in a car crash). Joy, grieving, sets up a family reunion. Clyde takes Paul swimming and is surprised  when he excels. Paul sneaking out to go swimming again, witnesses a shady security officer going through Phillip's papers in his car, but tells no one. The family go to the beach the next day and Paul nearly drowns. Marilyn is positive she saw someone push him down the creek. Paul, driving in and out of sleep, overhears the family arguing about Vishnu's and Mousey's will money. Some time later, Joy asks Marilyn to do a mental assessment on Paul after learning he must be kept down a grade and is struggling severely in school. During the assessment Paul walks out and meets a man who invites him into his hut to watch a match. Paul, a little older, cuts his hair to please his father. Clyde organised for Paul to be able to go to the same school Peter goes. The Priest (Father Kavenaugh- a foreign teacher at his school) sees all of Paul's wrong answers and tells him to come to extra classes. Paul tells him he's “slightly retarded” which the Priest sternly disagrees with and pledges to find his own way to help Paul with his education. Philip is killed by bandits for being the judge on a major drug crime case. During a hurricane, Father Kavenaugh drives Pater and Paul home, and has an argument with Clyde about whether or not Paul is “retarded”.

Paul gets kidnapped by some men outside of his house.

References

2019 British novels
Novels set in Trinidad and Tobago
Indo-Trinidadian and Tobagonian culture
Faber and Faber books